Pietari (Pekka) Ikonen (18 July 1877, in Jääski – 13 September 1956) was a Finnish farmer, bank director and politician. He was a member of the Parliament of Finland from 1914 to 1916, representing the Finnish Party.

References

1877 births
1956 deaths
People from Vyborg District
People from Viipuri Province (Grand Duchy of Finland)
Finnish Lutherans
Finnish Party politicians
Members of the Parliament of Finland (1913–16)